The first season of Big Brother VIP was confirmed on March 13, 2013 by TVI and premiered on 21 April 2013. The season was hosted by Teresa Guilherme and came with a live channel to watch the Housemates 24 hours a day. This is the first celebrity edition of Big Brother in Portugal to use the name Big Brother VIP and the third overall after the format aired under the name Big Brother Famosos for two seasons.

Housemates

Twists

The Shed 
Two days before the Launch, on Você na TV!, a talk show in the morning of TVI, was revealed the house will have two areas:
 The House, where the housemates will have all luxury;
 The Shed, where the housemates will live in the "hell".

Also was revealed that the house have 1000 m2 and 50 microphones and 30 cameras.

Summary 
 On Day 1, Carolina and Flávio decided every housemate's fate as to who would move in the House or the Shed.
 On Day 5, the Shed nominees (Francisco and Nucha) moved to the House. To complete her task, Kelly moved to the Shed. The House captain Zé-Zé, had to choose a celebrity from the House to move to the Shed. Francisco and Nucha are not eligible to move, as they were recently moved to the House, and Hugo, too, because he is a nominee. Zé-Zé chose to move Pedro.
 On Day 8, all housemates moved to the other House. So, the celebrities who were in the Shed moved to the House, and who was in the House moved to the Shed.
 On Day 11, the Shed nominees (Nucha and Zé-Zé) moved to the House. One male and one female from the House, who had the fewest votes in the nominations, will move to the Shed. Calado received zero votes in the nominations and moved to the Shed. Marta and Sara received one vote each in the nominations. As House Captain, Pedro had to choose between them. He chose Sara to move to the Shed.
 On Day 15, after the live show all celebrities from the Shed were moved to the House and the celebrities from the House moved to the Shed except Francisco and Zé-Zé for being the youngest and oldest celebrities.
 On Day 17, in the live nominations show, the two captains moved Houses. So, Marta moved to the House and Raquel to the Shed.
 On Day 18, the House nominees (Carla and Joka) moved to the Shed. The second most voted celebrities from the Shed in the nominations will go to the House. Flávio and Liliana received two votes each and moved to the House.
 On Day 20, the nominees (Carla, Joka, Francisco and Kelly) moved to the House. Also, Liliana, Flávio, Edmundo and Calado moved to the Shed.
 On Day 23, the celebrities went to their original group.
 On Day 25, the Shed nominees (Kelly and Pedro) moved to the Luxury House. To the Luxury Houses, celebrities had two options: to choose two celebrities to move to the Shed or to not move anyone to the Shed. They decided to not move anyone to the Shed.
 On Day 29, the new housemates entered to the Shed.
 On Day 30, they all moved houses, exempt Mafalda and Calado.
 On Day 36, they all moved houses, exempt Mafalda.
 On Day 39, the Shed nominees (Carla and Raquel) moved to the House.
 On Day 40, all the female housemates moved to the House. Edmundo won a challenge against all the male housemates and moved to the House as a reward. All the other males moved to the Shed.
 On Day 43, the winner of a task (Sara, Calado, Pedro and Francisco), won the right to stay in the House with Edmundo (previous winner of the kiss task). The others (Kelly, Flávio, Tino, Mafalda and Kapinha) moved to the Shed.
 On Day 50, they all moved houses, exempt Edmundo and Kapinha.
 On Day 57, to welcome the new guest Nuno Homem de Sá, free movement between the House and the Shed is allowed.
 On Day 58, the girls moved to the Shed, and the boys moved to the House.
 On Day 66, they all moved houses, exempt Sara and Tino.
 On Day 72, Pedro (the only Captain) decides who goes to the Shed. He decided that all the boys go to the Shed, and the girls stay in the Luxury House.
 On Day 85, the twist of the Shed ended.

Captains 
Each week, there will be 2 captains: the House Captain and the Shed Captain. They are immune and exempt to nominate.

Immunities 
Celebrities can be immune from the nominations, for some reasons.

Week 1:
Carolina and Flávio are immune and exempt for nominate, as a reward to complete their task to choose the celebrities to go to the Shed or to the House.
 Kelly is immune and exempt for nominate, to complete her task to be a "Portuguese woman". She has to learn more about Portugal and has to "try" to have a Portuguese accent. The House celebrities will help her.
Week 2:
Kelly is immune and exempt for nominate, as a reward for completed her task.
Week 5:
Kapinha and Mafalda are immune and exempt for nominate, as they are new housemates.
Week 6:
Tino is immune and exempt for nominate, as he is a new housemate.
Week 7:
Cátia and Fanny are no longer guests and become full contestant. They are immune and exempt from nomination.
Week 9:
Cátia and Kapinha won a challenge. As a reward, each could give immunity to someone. Jorge gave immunity to Mafalda, and Cátia gave immunity to Fanny.
 Kelly won immunity in a challenge. They had to found a key, who open a box. Inside the box, there was a reward (immunity).
Week 13:
Tino won immunity, after winning a task.

Fake nominations and votings
On Day 45, the housemates had to choose either Fanny or Cátia to be an official housemate. But, as of this was fake, and both are official housemates. If that was true, Fanny would become an official housemate, and Cátia would be eliminated.

On Day 73, the housemates had to vote for someone to be the finalist. The housemate with the most votes would win a free pass to the final. If that was true, Flávio would become finalist, but that was fake, again. The Captain can also vote and can be voted.

On Day 73, the housemates did fake nominations, when they thought they were real. There were two groups: the ones who are since Day 1, and the ones who entered later. The ones who are since Day 1, nominate the ones who entered later and vice versa (Since Day 1 housemates are without color, and entered later housemates are with blue color). The Captain (Pedro) is immune and exempt to nominate.

House guests 
Beginning on Day 22, houseguests entered the House. The houseguests who will enter will be ignored. The celebrities have to continue what they were doing, believing that the houseguests aren't there. The celebrities can't speak to them. They can't say anything to the houseguests. The houseguests can talk with them, and finger them. If they have contact with the houseguests, they will be punished. If they have a strong intimacy with the houseguests, they can be ejected.

Also, from Day 45, Cátia and Fanny aren't guests anymore and are now housemates.

Nominations table 
  -  This housemate was the House Captain.
  -  This housemate was the Shed Captain.
  -  This housemate was in the Shed.
  - This housemate was given or won immunity for that week.
The name in Bold were the first round of nominations.

Notes

Nominations: Results

Nominations total received

References

External links 
 Official Website 
 Official Facebook 
 Fan Website 

Big Brother (Portuguese TV series)
2013 Portuguese television seasons
Portugal